Bulbophyllum sect. Megaclinium is a section of the genus Bulbophyllum.

Description
Species in this section have a creeping rhizome and 4 pollina.

Distribution
Plants from this section are found in Africa.

Species
Bulbophyllum section  Megaclinium comprises the following species:

References

Orchid subgenera